Egil One-Hand is a berserker hero from the Icelandic legendary saga Egils saga einhenda ok Ásmundar berserkjabana.

Life
Egil was the son of Hring ruler of Småland and Ingibjorg, daughter of Earl Bjarkmar of Gautland. Egil was a troublesome young boy who would often go with a gang of his friends into the woods and kill birds and animals for sport.

At the age of twelve, Egil and all his friends had a competition to see who could swim across a large lake near his home. Egil quickly out swam everyone else and found himself  lost in a thick fog. He wandered around the water for a few days until finally coming to shore, where he promptly fell asleep from exhaustion. When he awoke he was met by a Giant who forced Egil tend after his many difficult goats, should Egil ever fail in his tending, the Giant promised to murder him.

After a year of this Egil attempted to escape, but was caught by the giant within 4 days. The Giant upset at Egil's escape attempt placed two iron clamps, each with 40 pound weights on them, on Egil's feet. Egil had to carry the load with him where ever he went for the next seven years.

Once when Egil was out late searching for a goat who had run off, he found a cat and captured it. When he Egil returned to the Giant's cave, the Giant asked him how he was able to see in the dark. Egil explained he had special Golden eyes, when the Giant inquired more about these eyes, Egil flashed him the cat eyes. The Giant wanted them rather badly and agreed to an exchange of Egil's freedom for the Golden Eyes. In order to do the operation Egil tied the giant to a column and ripped out the Giant's eyes. He then told the Giant he had made a mistake and dropped the Golden Eyes into the fire. The Giant became very upset and ran to the door of the cave where he locked it and set up guard in front of it. Egil after some days of debating took a goat and killed it and sewed its hide around him so he felt like a goat. Then he caused a stampede towards the door and tried to slip out with the other goats. The Giant, however could tell that Goat-Egil's hooves were not clicking and grabbed him, he tried to kill Egil but missed because of his blindness and cut off Egil's ear instead. Egil responded by cutting off the giants right hand and stealing a valuable ring from him, and running away.

After spending some time free in the wilderness Egil came across Viking ships, under the command of a man named Borgar. Egil joined their crew until one day when a Berserker named Glammad fought Borgar, in the ensuing battle both men perished and Egil took over at leader of the both Viking companies. Hand picking the 32 best, he went on his way plundering and pillaging the baltic.

While plundering Egil saw battle on an island between a giantess with a very short skirt and giant, who were fighting over a ring. Egil went to assist the giantess and cut off a large portion of the giant's biceps. The giant then cut off Egil's arm and Egil ran away back to his men and ships, where they set sail immediately. A few days later at port, Egil was unable to sleep because of the pain from his stubbed arm. He went for a walk in the forest where he came across a Dwarf child fetching water. Egil took one of his gold rings and let it secretly fall into the child's pail. Later on an adult Dwarf came from the rock and wanted to know who had done this kindness for the child, Egil explained that he had done it  for gold was little use to him in his agony. The Dwarf then took Egil aside and dressed his wound until it no longer hurt and indeed seemed healed. Then the Dwarf fitted a sword into Egil's arm so deeply that it went to his elbow, allowing Egil to strike easily with it, as if he still had a hand.

At some later point Egil and his men traveled to the Kingdom of Russia under King Hertygg, where they began plundering and laying waste to it. Rognvald, the leader of man charged with defending Russia attempted to fight and stop Egil with three times as many men. The battle went poorly for Rognvald, who lost all his men except for a handful. Rognavald was mortally wounded himself, having only enough strength left to report what had happened to the king.

Asmund Berserkers-Slayer, who was with the King when Rognvald reported of the battle, then offered to go meet Egil and avenge Rognvald, the King agreed and Asmund set off. Once met, Asmund and Egil decided it'd be better not to waste so much life and for each other to just duel, and so three times they dueled, each time ending in an exhausted draw. However the final time Asmund gained the upper hand and was able to force Egil to surrender. Afterwards Egil pledged his loyalty to King Hertrygg.

Not long after Asmund and Egil decided to go search for the king's missing daughter, and the two set out on a voyage.

References and footnotes

Sources

Legendary sagas
Legendary Norsemen